Left oriented parties in India have formed a political block called "Left Front" in the states of West Bengal (Left Front (West Bengal)) from 1977 and in Tripura also from 1993 (Left Front (Tripura).

List of parties  
 Communist Party of India
 Communist Party of India (Marxist)
 All India Forward Bloc 
 Revolutionary Socialist Party [except in Kerala where it belongs to UDF]

Lok Sabha election tally
 

* : 12 seats in Assam and 1 in Meghalaya did not vote.

References 

Election results in India
Left-wing politics